The Adventures of Mark Twain (released in the United Kingdom as Comet Quest) is a 1985 American stop motion claymation fantasy film directed by Will Vinton and starring James Whitmore. It received a limited theatrical release in May 1985. It was released on DVD in January 2006, and again as a collector's edition in 2012 on DVD and Blu-ray.

The film features a series of vignettes extracted from several of Mark Twain's works, built around a plot that features Twain's attempts to keep his "appointment" with Halley's Comet. Twain and three children, Tom Sawyer, Huck Finn and Becky Thatcher, travel on an airship between various adventures.

Plot
Huckleberry Finn and Tom Sawyer sneak aboard an airship piloted by Mark Twain in an attempt to become famous aeronauts. After having a bout of one-upmanship, Becky Thatcher follows them to call their bluff. The balloon takes off and the stowaways are soon discovered but are surprised to learn Mark Twain already knows their names. Upon seeing the frog the boys had caught outside of town, Twain relates his first popular short story: The Celebrated Jumping Frog of Calaveras County.

They find that he intends to pilot the airship to meet Halley's Comet, and are worried this goal will end in all their deaths. The boys stumble across the Index-o-Vator, a strange elevator that can take them to any part of the vessel, or into any of Twain’s writing, and meet up with Twain and Becky. She’s intrigued by a coin-operated automaton of Adam and Eve, and Twain takes the chance to begin their tale, based on Eve's Diary and Extracts From Adam's Diary. The story comes to a halt when just as storm clouds fill the Garden of Eden, a real storm surrounds the airship. Twain quickly coaches the kids on how to pilot to ship, but they fail to avoid smashing into a mountain and losing a chunk of the hull.

Dejected, the trio head back to the Index-o-Vator, where the door opens to The Adventures of Tom Sawyer. Huck and Becky are excited at the opportunity to get home, but Tom only cares about avoiding Aunt Betty’s chores and changes the floor before the others can protest. Out of the open void emerges Mark Twain, now dressed in a black suit instead of his usual white one, who changes the floor and encourages the kids to go into a scene from The Chronicles of Young Satan.

Tom fills Huck and Becky in on his plan, and the three conspire to sabotage the suicidal voyage and take control of the ship. They lay low as Twain teaches them how to fly the vessel, and Tom senses an opportunity in the central power panel. They follow Twain into his office to tie him up when he falls asleep, but much to their surprise the writer greets them again on the deck. The kids ask if there’s another life waiting for them after they collide with the comet, and Twain relates the story of Captain Stormfield's Visit to Heaven.

With their plan in place, the kids wait anxiously as Twain continues the story of Adam and Eve, the designs of the old couple looking much like Mark Twain and his wife, Olivia, with Twain saying “wherever she was, there was Eden.” He laments on her death and wishes to see her again when he meets the comet. The children discover the truth behind Twain's journey: he believes he is destined to die with the return of the comet and this journey is his way of accepting his fate, leaving the kids behind unharmed. It’s too late however, and Tom’s contraption goes off, destroying the main power and trapping them below decks. Huck’s frog saves the day, leaping from the porthole to land on the back-up power button.

The crew head off, the kids now piloting the ship expertly with Twain in command. They enter the comet, and finally come face to face with the strange figure who has been haunting the ship: Mark Twain’s double. Twain explains that the double is his darker side, who is as much an important part of him as the lighthearted humorist they're familiar with. The two give the kids several pieces of advice, all real Mark Twain quotes, and muse on whether or not there’s another life waiting for them. They merge and disappear into dust. Twain’s face appears in the comet’s clouds, and when asked where he's going answers "back to Eden".

The airship is blown out of the comet by Twain, and the kids decide to write up their journey in a book called, "The Adventures of Mark Twain by Huck Finn".

Cast
 James Whitmore as Mark Twain
 Michele Mariana as Becky Thatcher
 Gary Krug as Huck Finn
 Chris Ritchie as Tom Sawyer
 John Morrison as Adam
 Carol Edelman as Eve
 Dallas McKennon as Jim Smiley and Newspaper Boy
 Herb Smith as The Stranger
 Marley Stone as Aunt Polly
 Michele Mariana & Wilbur Vincent as The Mysterious Stranger
 Wally Newman as Captain Stormfield
 Tim Conner as Three-Headed Alien
 Todd Tolces as Saint Peter
 Billy Scream as The Indexivator
 Will Vinton as Dan'l Webster
 Billy Victor as God
 Compton Downs as Injun Joe
 Gary Thompson as Baby Cain

Production
The concept was inspired by a famous quote by the author:

Twain died on April 21, 1910, one day after Halley's Comet reached perihelion in 1910.

This animated film, which tested well with teens and college students before it was labeled with a G rating which hurt their box office chances, was shot in Portland, Oregon and when he was asked about the rumors of this film being made by a 17-person crew, Vinton stated:

Reception and legacy
On Rotten Tomatoes it has a score of 80% based on reviews from five critics, with an average rating of 8/10. On Common Sense Media it has 3/5 stars.

Animation critic Charles Solomon listed it as one of the best animated films of the 1980s a year after the film's release.

See also
 Mark Twain in popular culture
 List of stop-motion films
 List of animated feature films

References

External links
 
 
 

1985 films
1980s American animated films
1985 fantasy films
American animated fantasy films
Atlantic Entertainment Group films
Films based on works by Mark Twain
Films set in 1910
Films set in the 1910s
Films directed by Will Vinton
1985 animated films
Cultural depictions of Adam and Eve
Fiction about God
Fiction about Halley's Comet
Films based on multiple works
Films shot in Portland, Oregon
Clay animation films
Demons in film
The Devil in film
Cultural depictions of Mark Twain
1980s stop-motion animated films
1980s English-language films